Akeal Jerome Hosein (born 25 April 1993) is a Trinidadian cricketer who has played for Trinidad and Tobago in West Indian domestic cricket, as well as representing the Trinbago Knight Riders in the Caribbean Premier League (CPL).

Domestic and T20 career
Born in Port of Spain, Hosein represented the West Indies under-19s at the 2012 Under-19 World Cup in Australia. His first-class debut for Trinidad and Tobago came during the 2012–13 Regional Four Day Competition, against Jamaica. The following season, Hosein was man of the match in consecutive games, taking 6/33 and 5/34 against the Windward Islands and then scoring a maiden first-class century, 102 not out, against the Leewards. He subsequently signed with the Barbados Tridents for the 2014 Caribbean Premier League, and has since made appearances for the team at the 2014 Champions League Twenty20 and the 2015 CPL tournaments.

In November 2019, he was named in Trinidad and Tobago's squad for the 2019–20 Regional Super50 tournament. In July 2020, he was named in the Trinbago Knight Riders squad for the 2020 Caribbean Premier League. On 23 December 2022, he was bought by Sunrisers Hyderabad for IPL 2023.

International career
In December 2020, Hosein was named in the West Indies' One Day International (ODI) squad for their series against Bangladesh. He made his ODI debut for the West Indies, against Bangladesh, on 20 January 2021. In February 2021, he was named in the West Indies' Twenty20 International (T20I) squad for their series against Sri Lanka.

In May 2021, Akeal was given white-ball central contract by the Cricket West Indies for the 2020–21 season. He was one of the 10 players to be given a white-ball central contract for the 2020–21 season. In June 2021, he was added to the West Indies' Twenty20 International (T20I) squad for their series against South Africa. He made his T20I debut on 3 July 2021, for the West Indies against South Africa. In July 2021, he was included in the West Indies squad to play the last two T20Is against Australia.

In September 2021, Hosein was named as one of four reserve players in the West Indies' squad for the 2021 ICC Men's T20 World Cup. In October 2021, Hosein was added to the West Indies' 2021 ICC Men's T20 World Cup squad replacing Fabian Allen who was ruled out with an ankle injury.

References

External links
Player profile and statistics at CricketArchive
Player profile and statistics at ESPNcricinfo

1993 births
Living people
West Indies One Day International cricketers
West Indies Twenty20 International cricketers
Barbados Royals cricketers
Cricketers from Port of Spain
Trinidad and Tobago cricketers
Trinidad and Tobago representative cricketers
Trinbago Knight Riders cricketers
Melbourne Renegades cricketers